Stanley Allan Sytsma (born May 3, 1956) is a former American football linebacker who played for the Atlanta Falcons of the National Football League (NFL). He played college football at the University of Minnesota.

References 

1956 births
Living people
Minnesota Golden Gophers football players
American football linebackers
Atlanta Falcons players